Mahmoud Reza Pahlavi (5 October 1926 – 15 March 2001) was a member of Iran's Pahlavi dynasty. He was a son of Reza Shah and a half-brother of Mohammad Reza Pahlavi.

Biography
Pahlavi was born on 5 October 1926 as the third child of Reza Shah and Esmat Dowlatshahi. He received primary education in Persia (Iran) and then went to Switzerland for secondary education. He enrolled in Tehran's military school but following his father's abdication in 1941 he moved with him to South Africa. After his father's death, he temporarily returned to Iran before moving to the United States to study business and industrial management at the University of California and University of Michigan.

Upon his return to Iran he married Mehrdokht Azam Zangeneh in 1954 but the couple divorced after three years. In 1964, he married Maryam Eghbal, the 18-year-old daughter of Manouchehr Eghbal. This marriage also ended in divorce and Eghbal later married Pahlavi's nephew Shahriar Shafiq.

Mahmoud Reza Pahlavi had activities in the agricultural sector and rural development in Iran during the Pahlavi era. His relations with his half-brother and the Shah, Mohammed Reza Pahlavi, became strained due to his involvement in opium trafficking business. Thus, he was banned from participating in royal events by the Shah.

After the Iranian Revolution, Mahmoud Reza Pahlavi moved to the United States. In May 1992 he was arrested in Beverly Hills due to allegations of possessing and selling opium. He died on 15 March 2001 at the age of 74.

References

1926 births
2001 deaths
Exiles of the Iranian Revolution in the United States
Iranian royalty
Iranian emigrants to the United States
Mazandarani people
Mahmoud Reza
Sons of kings